The ninth and final season of Dynasty originally aired in the United States on ABC from November 3, 1988 through May 11, 1989. The series, created by Richard and Esther Shapiro and produced by Aaron Spelling, revolves around the Carringtons, a wealthy family residing in Denver, Colorado.

Season nine stars John Forsythe as millionaire oil magnate Blake Carrington; Linda Evans as his wife Krystle; Gordon Thomson as Blake and Alexis's eldest son Adam; Heather Locklear as Krystle's niece Sammy Jo; Michael Nader as Alexis's husband Dex Dexter;  Emma Samms as Blake and Alexis' daughter Fallon; John James as Fallon's ex-husband Jeff Colby; Leann Hunley as Adam's wife Dana; Stephanie Beacham as Alexis's cousin Sable Colby; Tracy Scoggins as Sable's daughter Monica; and Joan Collins as Alexis Colby, Blake's ex-wife and the mother of Adam, Fallon, Steven, and Amanda.

Development
David Paulsen joined Dynasty as Executive Supervising Producer for its ninth season, and took over the plotting of the series. In a money-saving move, Evans appeared in only six episodes early in the season as an ailing Krystle seeks brain surgery in Switzerland but is left in an offscreen coma. Similarly to cut costs, Collins was contracted for only 13 out of the season's 22 episodes. Former The Colbys character Sable (Stephanie Beacham) was brought in as both a platonic confidante for Blake and a nemesis for Alexis, and Tracy Scoggins also reprised her Colbys role as Sable's daughter Monica. The series moved from Wednesday to Thursday, but ratings continued to decline and Dynasty was ranked #69 in the United States for the season. In May 1989, new ABC entertainment president Robert A. Iger cancelled Dynasty, making the last episode of season nine the series finale. The show ended on a cliffhanger with Blake, Fallon, Krystina, Alexis, and Dex in mortal peril.

Plot
A storyline involving a murder and an old secret tying the Carrington, Colby, and Dexter families together spanned the season as Alexis and Sable sparred first over business and then over Dex.

Cast

Main

John Forsythe as Blake Carrington
Linda Evans as Krystle Carrington
John James as Jeff Colby
Gordon Thomson as Adam Carrington
Michael Nader as Dex Dexter
Heather Locklear as Sammy Jo Carrington
Emma Samms as Fallon Carrington Colby
Leann Hunley as Dana Waring
Tracy Scoggins as Monica Colby
Stephanie Beacham as Sable Colby
Joan Collins as Alexis Carrington

Recurring

Ray Abruzzo as Sgt. John Zorelli
Kim Terry-Costin as Joanna Sills
Liza Morrow as Virginia Metheny
Kevin Bernhardt as Father Tanner McBride
John Brandon as Capt. William Handler
J. Eddie Peck as Roger Grimes
Virginia Hawkins as Jeanette Robbins
Kenneth Tigar as Fritz Heath
Lezlie Deane as Phoenix Chisolm
William Beckley as Gerard
 Christopher Neame as Hamilton Stone

Notable guest stars

Ed Marinaro as Creighton Boyd
Hank Brandt as Morgan Hess

Cast notes

Episodes

Reception
In season nine, Dynasty was ranked #69 in the United States with a 10.5 Nielsen rating.

References

External links
 

1988 American television seasons
1989 American television seasons
Dynasty (1981 TV series) seasons